The UK R&B Chart is a weekly chart that ranks the 40 biggest-selling singles and albums that are classified in the R&B genre in the United Kingdom. The chart is compiled by the Official Charts Company, and is based on physical and other physical formats. This is a list of the UK's biggest R&B hits of 1996.

Number ones

See also
List of UK Dance Singles Chart number ones of 1996
List of UK Independent Singles Chart number ones of 1996
List of UK Rock & Metal Singles Chart number ones of 1996
List of UK R&B Albums Chart number ones of 1996

References

UK RandB Singles
1996
1996 in British music